Gali Saraswathamma is a member of the Andhra Pradesh Legislative Council, India. After the death of Gali Muddu Krishnama Naidu, she was given the ticket from the Telugu Desam Party. She won the election unopposed.

References

Date of birth missing (living people)
Living people
Members of the Andhra Pradesh Legislative Council
Telugu Desam Party politicians
Year of birth missing (living people)